Saxon-Sion is a commune in the Meurthe-et-Moselle department in north-eastern France. In it are located the villages of Saxon and Sion.

See also
 Communes of the Meurthe-et-Moselle department

References

Saxonsion
Leuci